Oakland City University (OCU) is a private university affiliated with the General Baptist Church and located in Oakland City, Indiana. It is the only General Baptist Church-affiliated college or university in the United States. Founded in 1885, it has slowly grown to the present student enrollment of about 1,200 on the main campus and, counting all sites, about 2,000 total.

In addition to the institution's Oakland City main campus, the university has satellite campuses in Evansville, Indianapolis, Rockport and Bedford. The Bedford branch is housed in the former headquarters of the Indiana Limestone Company. These sites emphasizes experiential application over objectives and theory. Students from a wide age range attend OCU. Courses are provided in an accelerated pace and condensed format, much like how summer school operates in more traditional programs. Students may take one or two courses at a time and enroll as full-time.

History
In June 1885, the Educational Board of General Baptists organized and then gained a charter from the state of Indiana to operate a college at Oakland City. However, because of a lack of funds, the first building, a two-story brick structure housing the administration and classrooms, was not complete until 1891—the same year Oakland City College opened its doors for classes. In those early days, the school was called "the college on the hill."

By the mid-1920s, the school had reached a zenith for the first half of the century. There were several college buildings gracing the grounds, including an expanded administration building, Wheatley Hall, a women's dorm, a field house, Memorial Gym (which housed a library in the basement), Cronbach Hall, a building used for agricultural and industrial arts classes, and a two-story brick building called the president's house. Beside the normal, liberal arts and theological school, the college had added a large industrial and agricultural department to respond to the vocational needs of the rural area it served.  The college offered several sports and clubs, and enrollment during this period often exceeded 1,000 students a semester.

The Great Depression hit the school hard, and faculty and staff often forwent paychecks to keep the school running. The end of World War II and the GI Bill saw a resurgence in enrollment and, by the mid-1960s, the "college on the hill" experienced an upswing comparable to the 1920s. Several new buildings were constructed on the campus including four dormitories, a new library, Brengle Hall, a science building, and Stinson Hall.

By the fall term of 1973, enrollment had dropped considerably.  The sponsoring denomination, the General Baptists, made a successful effort to raise funds to keep the school open and hired James Murray as the college president. In the 1990s the college moved to university status under Murray's leadership. Presently the school has an enrollment of 2,000 and has seen the construction of six new buildings in the last few years. Today, the university stands fully accredited and offers five graduate degrees and over 40 undergraduate programs.

Academics
Oakland City University is accredited by the Higher Learning Commission and Association of Theological Schools. The business programs on the main campus are accredited by the International Assembly for Collegiate Business Education.

Athletics
The Oakland City (OCU) athletic teams are called the Mighty Oaks. The university is a member of the National Association of Intercollegiate Athletics (NAIA), primarily competing in the River States Conference (RSC; formerly known as the Kentucky Intercollegiate Athletic Conference (KIAC) until after the 2015–16 school year) since the 2020–21 academic year; which they were a member on a previous stint from 1968–69 to 1974–75. They are also a member of the National Christian College Athletic Association (NCCAA), primarily competing as an independent in the Mid-East Region of the Division I level. The Mighty Oaks were previously a NCAA D-II Independent of the National Collegiate Athletic Association (NCAA) until after the 2019–20 school year.

Oakland City competes in 16 intercollegiate varsity sports: Men's sports include baseball, basketball, cross country, golf, soccer, sprint football, tennis and track & field; while women's sports include basketball, cross country, golf, soccer, softball, tennis, track & field and volleyball; and co-ed sports include cheerleading. The new team will compete in the Midwest Sprint Football League.

Schools and departments
School of Arts and Sciences
School of Education
Chapman Seminary
School of Business
School of Adult and Extended Learning
Chapman School of Religious Study

References

External links 
 Official website
 Official athletics website

River States Conference
Private universities and colleges in Indiana
Oakland City, Indiana
Bedford, Indiana
Education in Evansville, Indiana
Southwestern Indiana
Universities and colleges in Indianapolis
Educational institutions established in 1885
1885 establishments in Indiana
Education in Gibson County, Indiana
Buildings and structures in Gibson County, Indiana
Education in Lawrence County, Indiana
Education in Vanderburgh County, Indiana
Education in Spencer County, Indiana